JoWonder, born Joanna Woodward, has a multidisciplined artistic practice, she is a British painter, avant-garde stopmotion animator, performance artist and writer. She is noted for being from a generation of British avant-garde animators such as Brothers Quay and David Anderson. They made/make work which brings concepts from postmodern literature, the surrealist movement, and contemporary art to cinema. Her films, which use collage, textured painting, and text, provide counterpoint between the metaphysical and the playful. Lilliputian characters are often introduced to an apocalyptic realm ruled by giants. Her work combines religious, political, fairy-tale, and scientific themes using satire and symbolism  

She made her first commissioned short film, Sawdust for Brains and the Key of Wisdom, for Channel 4 Television in the 1990s.

Education
She was educated at St Martins School of Art and National Film and Television School.

Animated films
In 1990 her animated film The Brooch Pin and the Sinful Clasp using stop frame animation won the Grand Prize at Zagreb World Festival of Animated Film, the Direction Award for best first animated film at the British Animation Awards and the Time Out Film Award. It was also a part of Between Imagination and Reality, a programme of film and video selected by Tilda Swinton. 

According to Jonathon Romney of Sight and Sound Magazine 1992 volume 2 issue 7

"The Brooch Pin lends itself to being read as a male nightmare, but that is certainly where the resonances lie. " 

Expo Director Amanda Casson of the Creative Review called The Brooch Pin and the Sinful Clasp "an impressive short".

Video installation
In 2007, her video installation Flatlanders, expressing a judgement of the scale of ambition of science at CERN, was featured in Guildford Cathedral in connection with a science debate organised by Surrey University called Is science the new religion? attended by Jim Al-Khalili and Dr Brian Cox. The subject was based around the nuclear experiment at the European Organization for Nuclear Research (CERN).

One of her ongoing projects is 6 Days Goodbye Poems Of Ophelia, research funded by The Wellcome Trust and with a microbiology input by Dr Simon Park of Surrey University. Under The Microscope is an interpretation of Ophelia painted out of bacteria that incorporates messages to Ophelia from the public as part of the soundscape.

Performance
She has also been active as a performer. Her avant-garde performance art has included working within the experimental the Washroom Collective, which typically involves improvisation and audience interaction.

2012, May 2012,JoWonder and the Psychic Tea Leaves a site-specific 45-minute performance in the tradition of a Victorian seance, using the supernatural as subject  performed at the belfry of St Johns on Bethnal Green, part of First Thursdays organised by Whitechapel Art Gallery.

2019, September, The Woven Plait of Beatrice a part of a site-specific event The Woven with seven multidisciplinary artists and musicians inspired by the unique heritage of St. Leonard's, Shoreditch and, 2020 further developed as an experimental performance video.

Filmography
1980 The Grid starring Peter Murphy (musician). A New Contemporaries Prize Winner 1981, painting shown the same year. 
1985 The Hump Back Angel
1986 Two Children Threatened by a Nightingale
1989 The Brooch Pin and the Sinful Clasp (short) - NFTS. Live action and stop frame puppet animation: with renowned performance artist Rose English
1991 The Weatherhouse with IOU Theatre
1992 Sawdust for Brains and the Key of Wisdom (short) - Channel 4 Television
1997 The Cat
1998 Don't Submit to a Moments Passion with a Stranger
2004 Walking
2006 6 Days Goodbye Poems of Ophelia
2007 Flatlanders
2020 The Storyteller

Activism
In 2008, she set up British Women Artists (BWA), without government or arts establishment funding, using the scope of the internet to form an online portfolio of both known and unknown artists. In 2019 BWA became a (2008-2019) archive for women artists any nationality working in the UK; forming an alternative grassroots record of UK artistic practice establishing the group within reach of history.

Media appearances
 State of the Art - Channel 4, 1993 
 Moving Pictures - BBC, 1993

Selected exhibitions 
2020 - Dear Christine (a Tribute to Christine Keeler), Arthouse 1, London- Dear Christine (a Tribute to Christine Keeler),'' Elysium Gallery, Swansea, UK

Curated exhibitons 

 Jowonder curated an exhibition on the theme of Schrodinger’s Cat in 2022, with help from her Public Engagement Grant from the Institute of Physics which included 21 visual artists at the Bookery Gallerie, London.

References

 Suzanne Buchan, Woodward animator&pg=PT140#v=onepage&q=Joanna Into a Metaphysical Playroom
 https://books.google.co.uk/books?id=cqzSL8xTx2sC&lpg=PT140&dq=Joanna%20Woodward%20animator&pg=PT140#v=onepage&q=Joanna%20Woodward%20animator&f=false

External links
 Jowonder official site
Joanna Woodward (IMDB) 
UCA Animation Research Centre interview
Animation Festival 2013
Joanna Woodward at Lux Uk Collection
Joanna Woodward at BFI British Film Institute
The aestetic microbe:ProkaryArt and EukaryArt

21st-century British painters
British animators
British curators
British painters
British performance artists
British women artists
British women painters
English contemporary artists
British women animators
Living people
Alumni of the National Film and Television School
Alumni of Saint Martin's School of Art
Year of birth missing (living people)